Lychakivskyi District is an urban district of the city of Lviv, named after the historical district of Lychakiv. This district covers eastern part of the city. It contains such neighborhoods as Mayorivka, Pasiky, Pohulyanka, Yalivets and actually Lychakiv. In the east it includes the city of Vynnyky and Vynnyky forest.

See also
Subdivisions of Ukraine

Urban districts of Lviv